Stokes Bay is a bay in South Australia on the northern coast of Kangaroo Island located about  west of the town of Kingscote. The source of the bay's name is reported as taking its names from "supposedly takes its name from the first mate of the Hartley which arrived in South Australia in October 1837" and is not to be confused with a Henry Stokes (c.1808-1898), a sealer who lived on Kangaroo Island prior to 1836 or a John Stokes who arrived on the island in 1817 and who is reported as residing at Stokes Bay.

References

Bays of Kangaroo Island
Beaches of South Australia
Investigator Strait